ŽFK LASK was a women's football club based in Lazarevac, Serbia. The club played in Serbia's top level league, the Prva ženska liga.

The team began playing in 2003 and had their first season in the top league in 2006/07 reaching a 9th place of 10 teams. After that the team always finished above a 6th place with the best result being a third place in 2007/08.

In 2011 LASK was absorbed by SD Crvena Zvezda, which turned it into its women's football team.

Former players 
 Milica Mijatović
 Andrijana Trišić

External links

Women's football clubs in Serbia
Sport in Lazarevac
2003 establishments in Serbia
2011 disestablishments in Serbia